Nathan James Robinson (born c. 1989) is an English-American journalist, political commentator, and editor-in-chief of the left-wing progressive Current Affairs magazine, which he founded in 2015.

Early life and education 
Born in Stevenage, Hertfordshire, Robinson moved with his family to Sarasota, Florida, at age five. His father worked for an international corporate training firm in Britain before the move. He became an American citizen, along with his family, in 2001. Robinson attended Pine View School in Osprey, Florida, before attending Brandeis University, graduating with both a bachelor's degree and Master's degree in politics. Robinson received his J.D. degree from Yale Law School. Afterwards he pursued a Ph.D. in sociology and social policy at Harvard University. He took a leave of absence from the program after founding Current Affairs, eventually receiving his PhD in May 2022. As of 2021, Robinson lives in New Orleans, Louisiana.

Career 
Robinson founded the left-wing progressive magazine Current Affairs in 2015 after a Kickstarter campaign raised $16,000.

On February 10, 2021, Robinson published an article alleging that Guardian US editor John Mulholland fired him for tweeting criticism of U.S. military aid to Israel; Robinson had been a Guardian columnist. Robinson wrote a pair of tweets: "Did you know that the US congress is not actually permitted to authorize any new spending unless a portion of it is directed toward buying weapons for Israel? It’s the law.", and "or if not actually the written law then so ingrained in political custom as to functionally be indistinguishable from law". In his article, he said the tweets were a joke. In another tweet, Robinson shared an image of an email allegedly sent by Mulholland which said that since no such law exists, the tweet was "fake news"; noting the prevalence of antisemitic tropes regarding Jewish control of American public life, the email stated that Robinson's tweet was antisemitic. A representative for Guardian US stated Robinson was "neither a staff employee nor on contract and so was not 'fired'". Reason magazine said the distinction is marginal for recurring columnists.

Robinson has published critiques of Jordan Peterson, Ben Shapiro, Pete Buttigieg, Joe Biden, and others.

In August 2021, Robinson asked a number of Current Affairs staff to resign after disagreements on how the company should be run. Some staffers accused Robinson of asking staffers to resign because they wanted the magazine to be a worker-owned co-op. Journalist Glenn Greenwald called Robinson a "brazen hypocrite" on Twitter, and National Review writer Caroline Downey called Robinson's actions hypocritical. In response, Robinson said that he did not oppose the magazine being a worker-owned co-op, and the calls for resignation were due to organizational "dysfunction" and concern that the magazine "seemed to be losing sight of its core political goals."

Political views 
Robinson is a proponent of libertarian socialism, citing Noam Chomsky as his main political influence. He has criticized both totalitarian state socialism and free-market libertarian capitalism. He supports LGBTQ rights, abortion rights, animal rights, and Medicare for All.

Robinson has been critical of American foreign policy, including its military interventions in Afghanistan, Syria, and Iraq. He has remained critical of Israel and its human rights record. He has also criticized the United States' support for Israel and the United States' hostility towards critics of Israel. 

Robinson supported Bernie Sanders in the 2016 United States presidential election. After Sanders lost the Democratic nomination to Hillary Clinton, Robinson voted for Clinton. In the 2020 United States presidential election he supported Sanders again, and then Joe Biden after Biden won the Democratic nomination. Despite being critical of Biden and Kamala Harris, he believed that Donald Trump was a greater threat.

Robinson identifies as an atheist, and he has criticized prominent exponents of New Atheism, such as Sam Harris, Christopher Hitchens, and Richard Dawkins, saying, "at their worst they were bigoted and ignorant, possessing the very qualities that they deplored in the religious".

Books 
 2015 Blueprints for a Sparkling Tomorrow: Thoughts on Reclaiming the American Dream. Demilune Press;  (13).
 2016 Superpredator: Bill Clinton's Use and Abuse of Black America. Demilune Press;  (13).
 2017 Trump: Anatomy of a Monstrosity. Demilune Press;  (13).
 2017 The Current Affairs Mindset: Essays on People, Politics, and Culture. Demilune Press;  (13).
 2018 Nocturnal Emissions: A Diary of Dreams. Demilune Press; .
 2018 Interesting Times: Arguments & Observations. Demilune Press;  (13).
 2018 The Current Affairs Rules For Life. Demilune Press;  (13). 
 2019 Why You Should Be a Socialist. All Points Books;  (13).
 2019 My Affairs: A Memoir of the Magazine Industry (2016–2076). Independently published;  (13).

Illustrated books 
 2013 The Man Who Accidentally Wore His Cravat to a Gymnasium. Demilune Press;  (13).
 2014 Don't Let The Pigeon Question The Rules! Demilune Press; .
 2014 California Sojourn: An Illustrated Diary of Los Angeles. Demilune Press; .
 2018 The Current Affairs Big Book of Amusements, with Lyta Gold. Current Affairs Press; .

References

External links 

 
 
 Current Affairs – Robinson's articles at Current Affairs magazine
 "Nathan Robinson" – column archive at The Guardian

1989 births
21st-century American lawyers
21st-century American male writers
21st-century American non-fiction writers
21st-century essayists
American anti-capitalists
American anti-communists
American bloggers
American columnists
American libertarians
American male essayists
American male non-fiction writers
American online publication editors
American political writers
American social commentators
American socialists
American sociologists
Anti-Zionism in the United States
Anti-consumerists
Brandeis University alumni
Critics of neoconservatism
Critics of postmodernism
English bloggers
English columnists
English emigrants to the United States
English essayists
English libertarians
English male non-fiction writers
English political writers
English social commentators
English socialists
English sociologists
Florida lawyers
Harvard University alumni
Libertarian socialists
Living people
Naturalized citizens of the United States
People from Cambridge
People from Sarasota, Florida
People from Stevenage
Theorists on Western civilization
Writers about activism and social change
Writers about globalization
Writers from New Orleans
Writers who illustrated their own writing
Yale Law School alumni